Myna has gone (in Spanish Myna se va) is a Spanish film directed by Sonia Escolano and Sadrac González. It is a naturalistic, independent film and is played by unknown actors.
 
With a budget of only $4,500, the film won awards at several international film festivals including the Austin Film Festival, one of the top 10 U.S. film festivals.

Curiously, the film features a sequence shot of 33 minutes, the longest in the history of Spanish cinema. According to the directors, the actors needed psychological help during the filming because of the difficulty of the scenes. María del Barrio is the nineteen-year-old actress chosen to play the role of Myna, whose performance has been praised and won awards from several international film festivals including the Austin Film Festival and the Naperville Independent Film Festival.
In 2011 the film was released in theaters in the United States which include the cities of
Minneapolis, Los Angeles, St. Louis, Phoenix, Houston, San Francisco, Dallas, Seattle, Miami, Denver, New York, and Palm Beach.

Cast 
 María del Barrio as Myna
 David Lopez-Serrano Paez as the doctor
 Diana Facen as Ana, Pablo's mother
 Chema Rolland as George, Pablo's father
 Alvaro Pascual as the vet
 Francisco Sala as Pablo
 Marina Oria as Charles' wife

Awards

References

External links 

Official List of Spanish films in 2009. Source: Spanish Ministry of Culture (English/Spanish)
Nominations for the Goya Awards 2009 (Spanish)

2008 films
2000s Spanish-language films
2008 drama films
Spanish drama films
Films about immigration